Constantin Bușoiu (born 3 June 1941) is a Romanian wrestler. He competed in the men's Greco-Roman +97 kg at the 1968 Summer Olympics.

References

External links
 

1941 births
Living people
Romanian male sport wrestlers
Olympic wrestlers of Romania
Wrestlers at the 1968 Summer Olympics
People from Dâmbovița County